Laurence Coriat is a French screenwriter and short film director, best known for her work with Michael Winterbottom.

Biography
Coriat was born in France and moved to England in her twenties.
In 1999, she teamed with British filmmaker Michael Winterbottom on Wonderland which was selected in competition at Cannes in 1999 and won the best British Independent Film award that year. She would work with Winterbottom again on A Summer in Genoa,. Other features include Me Without You, Hunky Dory and Patagonia.

In 2018, she wrote for the British crime drama television series McMafia, inspired by the book McMafia: A Journey Through the Global Criminal Underworld (2008) by journalist Misha Glenny.

Filmography

References

External links

Living people
French film directors
French women screenwriters
Women television writers
21st-century French women writers
Year of birth missing (living people)
21st-century French screenwriters